Ken Austin (born December 15, 1961) is a retired American basketball player.

Born in Los Angeles, California, he played collegiately for Rice University.

He was selected by the Detroit Pistons in the fourth round (101st pick overall) of the 1983 NBA Draft.

He played for the Pistons (1983–84) in the National Basketball Association for 7 games.

External links 

1961 births
Living people
Basketball players from Los Angeles
American expatriate basketball people in Argentina
American expatriate basketball people in Belgium
American expatriate basketball people in France
American expatriate basketball people in Spain
American expatriate basketball people in Turkey
ASVEL Basket players
Cholet Basket players
Detroit Pistons draft picks
Detroit Pistons players
Detroit Spirits players
Liga ACB players
Power forwards (basketball)
Puerto Rico Coquis players
Rice Owls men's basketball players
American men's basketball players
Verbum Dei High School alumni
American expatriate basketball people in the Philippines
Philippine Basketball Association imports
Tanduay Rhum Masters players